Dicymolomia metalophota is a moth in the family Crambidae. It was described by George Hampson in 1897. It is found in the south-eastern United States (Florida, South Carolina, Texas) and Guatemala south-east to Venezuela. It is also present in the Caribbean.

The apical and tornal areas of the forewings are brownish-orange, as is the antemedial line. Adults have been recorded on wing year round.

The larvae possibly feed on Cajanus cajan.

References

Glaphyriinae
Moths described in 1897
Taxa named by George Hampson